Georgi Hristov (born 6 February 1978) is a Bulgarian footballer who plays as a goalkeeper.

External links 
  Profile

Bulgarian footballers
1978 births
Living people
Second Professional Football League (Bulgaria) players
PFC Ludogorets Razgrad players
Neftochimic Burgas players
Association football goalkeepers